The 1970 World Karate Championships are the 1st edition of the World Karate Championships, and were held in Tokyo and Osaka, Japan on October 10 and October 13, 1970.

Medalists

Medal table

Participating nations

References

 Results
 Results

External links
 World Karate Federation

World Championships
World Karate Championships
World Karate Championships
Karate competitions in Japan
Karate Championships